Qaleh-ye Jowzan (also Romanized as Qal‘eh-ye Jowzān; also known as Qalehjowzān) is a village in Jowzan Rural District, in the Central District of Malayer County, Hamadan Province, Iran. At the 2006 census, its population was 582, in 145 families.

References 

Populated places in Malayer County